Triplophysa microphthalma is a species of ray-finned fish in the genus Triplophysa,  it is placed in the subgenus Labiatophysa which is regarded by some authorities as a valid genus.

Footnotes 
 

microphthalma
Taxa named by Karl Kessler
Fish described in 1879